Letters from the Underground is the ninth studio album by folk-punk rock band the Levellers. It includes the single "Burn America Burn", which is a social commentary on the recurrence of school shootings in the US.

Track listing
 "The Cholera Well"
 "Death Loves Youth"
 "Eyes Wide"
 "Before the End"
 "Burn America Burn"
 "Heart of the Country"
 "Pale Rider"
 "A Life Less Ordinary"
 "Accidental Anarchist"
 "Duty"
 "Fight or Flight"

Bonus Disc - Letters From The Underground (Metway Acoustic)
 "On The Beach"
 "The Everyday"
 "TV Suicides"

Personnel

Musicians
 Mark Chadwick - guitars, vocals
 Charlie Heather - drums/percussion
 Jeremy Cunningham - bass guitar, artwork
 Simon Friend - guitars, vocals, mandolin
 Jonathan Sevink - fiddle
 Matt Savage - keyboard

Levellers (band) albums
2008 albums